José Soares Santa (25 December 1902 – 5 April 1968), known as Santa Camarão ("Camarão" being a family nickname meaning Shrimp in English) or Zé Santa in Portugal, and as Jose Santa or Joe Santa in the United States, was a Portuguese boxer. At  he was one of the tallest heavyweight boxers in history.

Life and career 

He was born in Ovar, and in 1911 moved to Lisbon, where his father was earning for his family. There he had a brief career in wrestling, before changing to professional boxing in 1922.

Santa's professional boxing career lasted until 1934, which he mostly spent in Portugal (1922–26, with a few fights later in 1929), Brazil (1926–28 and 1933–34), and the United States (1930–33) where he was widely popular with the Portuguese immigrants livings in southern Massachusetts and Rhode Island. He contested the European title in 1929 against Pierre Charles, but lost by points; he also lost to heavyweight champions Max Baer and Primo Carnera. He also signed for a three-round exhibition fight with former heavyweight champion Jack Johnson late in Johnson's career but the commission nixed it, fearing for Johnson's life.

Santa played himself in two boxing movies, Love in the Ring (1930) and The Prizefighter and the Lady (1933), alongside the boxing celebrities Max Schmeling, Max Baer and Jack Dempsey. Love in the Ring was the first international movie where Portuguese was spoken on screen, by Santa Camarão. He received US$8,000 for The Prizefighter and the Lady, which was his largest ever single payment.

In 1932, while fighting in the United States, Santa married the Portuguese American woman Mary Loreta de Oliveira. After retiring from the ring, in 1935 he took her back to his hometown. The same year Mary Loreta gave birth to his son, Renaldo José Santa. She separated from her husband in 1949, taking Renaldo with her.

Santa Camarão died in 1968 in Ovar, in the same house where he was born. Later a street in Lisbon was named Rua José Santa Camarão in his honor. In 2003, he was posthumously awarded the Medal for Good Sports Services (Medalha de Bons Serviços Desportivos) by the Government of Portugal.

Until Nikolay Valuev became a professional boxer in 1993, Santa was the tallest heavyweight in boxing history. He enjoyed a sizable reach advantage over most rivals, and when seen on fight footage, he seems like a towering giant compared to many heavyweights of his era, who were usually shorter than him.

Professional boxing record

|-
| style="text-align:center;" colspan="8"|69 Wins (48 knockouts), 20 Losses (7 knockouts), 4 Draws, 2 No Contests
|-  style="text-align:center; background:#e3e3e3;"
|  style="border-style:none none solid solid; "|Result
|  style="border-style:none none solid solid; "|Record
|  style="border-style:none none solid solid; "|Opponent
|  style="border-style:none none solid solid; "|Type
|  style="border-style:none none solid solid; "|Round
|  style="border-style:none none solid solid; "|Date
|  style="border-style:none none solid solid; "|Location
|  style="border-style:none none solid solid; "|Notes
|- align=center

|Loss 
|69-20-4 (2)
|align=left| Claudio Villar
|TKO
|9 
|11 November 1934
|align=left| 
|align=left|
|- align=center
|- align=center
|Loss 
|69-19-4 (2)
|align=left| Victorio Campolo
|TKO
|3 
|7 July 1934
|align=left| 
|align=left|
|- align=center
|- align=center
|Win 
|69-18-4 (2)
|align=left| Norman Tomasulo
|KO
|4 
|16 June 1934
|align=left| 
|align=left|
|- align=center
|- align=center
|Win 
|68-18-4 (2)
|align=left| Arturo Costarelli
|TKO
|5 
|5 May 1934
|align=left| 
|align=left|
|- align=center
|- align=center
|Loss 
|67-18-4 (2)
|align=left| Mario Lenzi
|PTS
|10
|1 February 1934
|align=left| 
|align=left|
|- align=center
|- align=center
|Win 
|67-17-4 (2)
|align=left| Guillermo Silva
|TKO
|4 
|25 November 1933
|align=left| 
|align=left|
|- align=center
|- align=center
|Win 
|66-17-4 (2)
|align=left| Gene Brown
|TKO
|5 
|2 August 1933
|align=left| 
|align=left|
|- align=center
|- align=center
|Win 
|65-17-4 (2)
|align=left| Kenneth Lee
|TKO
|3 
|28 July 1933
|align=left| 
|align=left|
|- align=center
|- align=center
|Loss 
|64-17-4 (2)
|align=left| KO Christner
|PTS
|10
|12 July 1933
|align=left| 
|align=left|
|- align=center
|- align=center
|Loss 
|64-16-4 (2)
|align=left| Gene Stanton
|KO
|9 
|24 May 1933
|align=left| 
|align=left|
|- align=center
|- align=center
|Win 
|64-15-4 (2)
|align=left| Gene Stanton
|PTS
|10
|26 April 1933
|align=left| 
|align=left|
|- align=center
|- align=center
|Win 
|63-15-4 (2)
|align=left| Johnny Dixon
|TKO
|3 
|2 March 1933
|align=left| 
|align=left|
|- align=center
|- align=center
|Win 
|62-15-4 (2)
|align=left| Jim Maloney
|TKO
|5 
|20 January 1933
|align=left| 
|align=left|Stopped after round 4 due to a cut
|- align=center
|- align=center
|Win 
|61-15-4 (2)
|align=left| Vinko Jakasa
|KO
|2 
|19 December 1932
|align=left| 
|align=left|
|- align=center
|- align=center
|Loss 
|60-15-4 (2)
|align=left| Primo Carnera
|TKO
|6 
|18 November 1932
|align=left| 
|align=left|
Santa down in the 2nd, 3rd and 6th, referee stoppage.
|- align=center
|- align=center
|Win 
|60-14-4 (2)
|align=left| Sammy Ward
|PTS
|10
|28 October 1932
|align=left| 
|align=left|
|- align=center
|- align=center
|Win 
|59-14-4 (2)
|align=left| Jack Meyer
|TKO
|2 
|14 September 1932
|align=left| 
|align=left|
|- align=center
|- align=center
|Win 
|58-14-4 (2)
|align=left| Bucky Harris
|TKO
|2 
|2 September 1932
|align=left| 
|align=left|
|- align=center
|- align=center
|Loss 
|57-14-4 (2)
|align=left| Ray Impelletiere
|TKO
|9 
|8 August 1932
|align=left| 
|align=left|
|- align=center
|- align=center
|Win 
|57-13-4 (2)
|align=left| Jack Gardner
|KO
|2 
|23 July 1932
|align=left| 
|align=left|
|- align=center
|- align=center
|Win 
|56-13-4 (2)
|align=left| Cecyl Myart
|KO
|5 
|13 July 1932
|align=left| 
|align=left|
|- align=center
|- align=center
|Win 
|55-13-4 (2)
|align=left| Ernie Stout
|TKO
|2 
|24 November 1931
|align=left| 
|align=left|
|- align=center
|- align=center
|Loss 
|54-13-4 (2)
|align=left|  
|KO
|10 
|21 October 1931
|align=left| 
|align=left|
|- align=center
|Draw
|54-12-4 (2)
|align=left| Tom Heeney
|PTS
|12
|5 October 1931
|align=left| 
|align=left|
|- align=center
|- align=center
|Loss 
|54-12-3 (2)
|align=left| Tom Heeney
|PTS
|12
|10 September 1931
|align=left| 
|align=left|
|- align=center
|- align=center
|Win 
|54-11-3 (2)
|align=left| Leon Chavelier
|PTS
|10
|3 August 1931
|align=left| 
|align=left|
|- align=center
|- align=center
|Win 
|53-11-3 (2)
|align=left| Roberto Roberti
|PTS
|10
|15 July 1931
|align=left| 
|align=left|
|- align=center
|- align=center
|Win 
|52-11-3 (2)
|align=left| Hans Birkie
|RTD
|6 
|1 July 1931
|align=left| 
|align=left|Taking a beating during the entire bout, Birkie quit at the end of round 6 claiming a broken hand
|- align=center
|- align=center
|Loss 
|51-11-3 (2)
|align=left| Hans Birkie
|PTS
|10
|8 June 1931
|align=left| 
|align=left|
|- align=center
|- align=center
|Win 
|51-10-3 (2)
|align=left| Johnny Grosso
|KO
|2 
|11 May 1931
|align=left| 
|align=left|
|- align=center
|- align=center
|Win 
|50-10-3 (2)
|align=left| Jack Beasley
|KO
|1 
|27 April 1931
|align=left| 
|align=left|
|- align=center
|- align=center
|Win 
|49-10-3 (2)
|align=left| Salvatore Ruggirello
|KO
|6 
|20 March 1931
|align=left| 
|align=left|Ruggirello down 13 times
|- align=center
|- align=center
|Win 
|48-10-3 (2)
|align=left| Jack Singer
|KO
|1 
|12 March 1931
|align=left| 
|align=left|
|- align=center
|- align=center
|Loss
|47-10-3 (2)
|align=left| Salvatore Ruggirello
|KO
|2 
|5 March 1931
|align=left| 
|align=left|
|- align=center
|- align=center
|style="background:#ddd;"|NC
|47-9-3 (2)
|align=left| Knute Hansen
|NC
|2 
|4 February 1931
|align=left| 
|align=left| Declared a no contest when Hansen fell without being hit
|- align=center
|- align=center
|Win 
|47-9-3 (1)
|align=left| Jack Silver
|KO
|1 
|12 January 1931
|align=left| 
|align=left|
|- align=center
|- align=center
|Win 
|46-9-3 (1)
|align=left| Roberto Roberti
|PTS
|10
|1 January 1931
|align=left| 
|align=left|
|- align=center
|- align=center
|Win 
|45-9-3 (1)
|align=left| Carl Carter
|KO
|3 
|31 October 1930
|align=left| 
|align=left|
|- align=center
|- align=center
|Win 
|44-9-3 (1)
|align=left| Tiny Hoffner
|KO
|1 
|21 October 1930
|align=left| 
|align=left|
|- align=center
|- align=center
|Win 
|43-9-3 (1)
|align=left| Gordon Munce
|TKO
|3 
|13 October 1930
|align=left| 
|align=left|
|- align=center
|- align=center
|Win 
|42-9-3 (1)
|align=left| Riccardo Bertazzolo
|PTS
|10
|3 October 1930
|align=left| 
|align=left|
|- align=center
|- align=center
|Win 
|41-9-3 (1)
|align=left| Otis Gardner
|KO
|1 
|22 September 1930
|align=left| 
|align=left|
|- align=center
|- align=center
|Win 
|40-9-3 (1)
|align=left| Umberto Torriano
|TKO
|4 
|15 September 1930
|align=left| 
|align=left|
|- align=center
|- align=center
|Win 
|39-9-3 (1)
|align=left| Emilio Solomon
|PTS
|10
|10 September 1930
|align=left| 
|align=left|
|- align=center
|- align=center
|Win 
|38-9-3 (1)
|align=left| Jack Shaw
|KO
|2 
|5 September 1930
|align=left| 
|align=left|
|- align=center
|- align=center
|Win 
|37-9-3 (1)
|align=left| Al Tottinger
|KO
|2 
|22 August 1930
|align=left| 
|align=left|
|- align=center
|- align=center
|Win 
|36-9-3 (1)
|align=left| Al Shearing
|KO
|3 
|14 August 1930
|align=left| 
|align=left|
|- align=center
|- align=center
|Win 
|35-9-3 (1)
|align=left| Andres Castano
|KO
|3 
|1 August 1930
|align=left| 
|align=left|
|- align=center
|- align=center
|Loss
|34-9-3 (1)
|align=left| Ernst Guehring
|PTS
|10
|11 April 1930
|align=left| 
|align=left|
|- align=center
|- align=center
|Win 
|34-8-3 (1)
|align=left| Rudi Wagener
|PTS
|10
|2 February 1930
|align=left| 
|align=left|
|- align=center
|- align=center
|Win 
|33-8-3 (1)
|align=left| Ernst Roesemann
|TKO
|5 
|5 January 1930
|align=left| 
|align=left|
|- align=center
|- align=center
|Draw
|32-8-3 (1)
|align=left| Jack Stanley
|PTS
|10
|17 December 1929
|align=left| 
|align=left|
|- align=center
|- align=center
|Win 
|32-8-2 (1)
|align=left| Robert Villard
|TKO
|2 
|7 December 1929
|align=left| 
|align=left|
|- align=center
|- align=center
|Loss
|31-8-2 (1)
|align=left| Hans Schoenrath
|PTS
|8
|22 November 1929
|align=left| 
|align=left|
|- align=center
|- align=center
|Win 
|31-7-2 (1)
|align=left| Jack Stanley
|PTS
|10
|1 November 1929
|align=left| 
|align=left|
|- align=center
|- align=center
|Loss
|30-7-2 (1)
|align=left| Pierre Charles
|PTS
|15
|30 June 1929
|align=left| 
|align=left|European title fight
|- align=center
|- align=center
|Win 
|30-6-2 (1)
|align=left| Constant Barrick
|KO
|2 
|14 April 1929
|align=left| 
|align=left|
|- align=center
|- align=center
|Win 
|29-6-2 (1)
|align=left| Jack Humbeeck
|KO
|6 
|6 March 1929
|align=left| 
|align=left|
|- align=center
|- align=center
|Loss 
|28-6-2 (1)
|align=left| Armando de Carolis
|PTS
|12
|3 November 1928
|align=left| 
|align=left|
|- align=center
|- align=center
|Loss 
|28-5-2 (1)
|align=left| Armando de Carolis
|PTS
|10
|5 August 1928
|align=left| 
|align=left|
|- align=center
|- align=center
|Win 
|28-4-2 (1)
|align=left| Orlando Reverberi
|PTS
|10
|9 June 1928
|align=left| 
|align=left|
|- align=center
|- align=center
|Win 
|27-4-2 (1)
|align=left| Epifanio Islas
|PTS
|12
|15 April 1928
|align=left| 
|align=left|
|- align=center
|- align=center
|Win 
|26-4-2 (1)
|align=left| Carlos Oldani
|PTS
|12
|22 December 1927
|align=left| 
|align=left|
|- align=center
|- align=center
|Loss 
|25-4-2 (1)
|align=left| Carlos Oldani
|PTS
|10
|14 November 1927
|align=left| 
|align=left|
|- align=center
|- align=center
|Win 
|25-3-2 (1)
|align=left| Paul Rod 
|KO
|1 
|23 October 1927
|align=left| 
|align=left|
|- align=center
|- align=center
|Win 
|24-3-2 (1)
|align=left| Epifanio Islas 
|PTS
|15
|7 September 1927
|align=left| 
|align=left|
|- align=center
|- align=center
|Win 
|23-3-2 (1)
|align=left| Juan Moragues
|PTS
|10
|5 July 1927
|align=left| 
|align=left|
|- align=center
|- align=center
|Win 
|22-3-2 (1)
|align=left| Paul Hams
|KO
|15 
|4 June 1927
|align=left| 
|align=left|
|- align=center
|- align=center
|Win 
|21-3-2 (1)
|align=left| Miguel Ferrara
|DQ
|9 
|14 May 1927
|align=left| 
|align=left|
|- align=center
|- align=center
|Win 
|20-3-2 (1)
|align=left| Jaime Escobar
|KO
|2 
|4 March 1927
|align=left| 
|align=left|
|- align=center
|- align=center
|Win 
|19-3-2 (1)
|align=left| Erwin Klausner
|TKO
|2 
|1 January 1927
|align=left| 
|align=left|
|- align=center
|- align=center
|Loss 
|18-3-2 (1)
|align=left| Epifanio Islas 
|PTS
|10
|1 December 1926
|align=left| 
|align=left|
|- align=center
|- align=center
|Loss 
|18-2-2 (1)
|align=left| Epifanio Islas 
|PTS
|10
|17 November 1926
|align=left| 
|align=left|
|- align=center
|- align=center
|Win 
|18-1-2 (1)
|align=left| Paul Hams
|PTS
|10
|7 September 1926
|align=left| 
|align=left|
|- align=center
|- align=center
|Draw
|17-1-2(1)
|align=left| Miguel Ferrara
|PTS
|10
|24 July 1926
|align=left| 
|align=left|
|- align=center
|- align=center
|Win 
|17-1-1 (1)
|align=left| Roberto di Lorenzo
|KO
|1 
|10 July 1926
|align=left| 
|align=left|
|- align=center
|- align=center
|Win 
|16-1-1 (1)
|align=left| Marc Lunaud
|KO
|6 
|7 May 1926
|align=left| 
|align=left|
|- align=center
|- align=center
|Win 
|15-1-1 (1)
|align=left| Rozi
|KO
|2 
|21 April 1926
|align=left| 
|align=left|
|- align=center
|- align=center
|Win 
|14-1-1 (1)
|align=left| Joe Mullings
|DQ
|3 
|12 April 1926
|align=left| 
|align=left|
|- align=center
|- align=center
|Draw
|13-1-1 (1)
|align=left| Constant Barrick
|PTS
|10 
|30 March 1926
|align=left| 
|align=left|
|- align=center
|- align=center
|style="background:#ddd;"|NC
|13-1 (1)
|align=left| Soldier Jones
|NC
|1 
|18 February 1926
|align=left| 
|align=left|
Fight stopped after first round due to very poor quality
|- align=center
|- align=center
|Win 
|13-1
|align=left| Guardsman Charlie Penwill
|KO
|3 
|11 February 1926
|align=left| 
|align=left|
|- align=center
|- align=center
|Win 
|12-1
|align=left| Constant Barrick 
|PTS
|10
|8 January 1926
|align=left| 
|align=left|
|- align=center
|- align=center
|Win 
|11-1
|align=left| Jack Taylor 
|PTS
|12
|22 December 1925
|align=left| 
|align=left|
|- align=center
|- align=center
|Loss 
|10-1
|align=left| Jack Humbeeck 
|PTS
|10
|3 November 1925
|align=left| 
|align=left|
|- align=center
|- align=center
|Win 
|10-0
|align=left| Jack Humbeeck 
|PTS
|10
|9 September 1925
|align=left| 
|align=left|
|- align=center
|- align=center
|Win 
|9-0
|align=left| Andres Balsa 
|TKO
|2 
|19 August 1925
|align=left| 
|align=left|
|- align=center
|- align=center
|Win 
|8-0
|align=left| Laurent Mahieu 
|TKO
|1 
|4 August 1925
|align=left| 
|align=left|
|- align=center
|- align=center
|Win 
|7-0
|align=left| Marcel Nilles 
|TKO
|3 
|26 July 1925
|align=left| 
|align=left|
|- align=center
|- align=center
|Win 
|6-0
|align=left| Paul Journee 
|KO
|2 
|20 June 1925
|align=left| 
|align=left|
|- align=center
|- align=center
|Win 
|5-0
|align=left| Laurent Mahieu 
|PTS
|10
|4 June 1925
|align=left| 
|align=left|
|- align=center
|- align=center
|Win 
|4-0
|align=left| Leon Derensy 
|KO
|1 
|12 May 1925
|align=left| 
|align=left|
|- align=center
|- align=center
|Win 
|3-0
|align=left| Arthur Vermaut 
|TKO
|2 
|22 April 1925
|align=left| 
|align=left|
|- align=center
|- align=center
|Win 
|2-0
|align=left| Georges Morgan 
|TKO
|4 
|8 April 1925
|align=left| 
|align=left|
|- align=center
|- align=center
|Win 
|1-0
|align=left| Albert Demoor 
|KO
|2
|3 April 1925
|align=left| 
|align=left|
|- align=center

References

External links 

 José Santa (III) (1902–1968). IMDb
 Movie clip with Max Schmeling and Jose Santa (YouTube)
  "Com o Mundo nos Punhos", by Luís Filipe Maçarico. CML Edition (2003). N. Dep. Legal 200844/03 PT
  "Santa Camarão", by Xavier Almeida. Chili com Carne Edition (2017)

1902 births
1968 deaths
People from Ovar
Heavyweight boxers
Portuguese male boxers
Sportspeople from Aveiro District